Lechenaultia acutiloba, commonly known as wingless leschenaultia, is a species of flowering plant in the family Goodeniaceae and is endemic to the south-west of Western Australia. It is a dome-shaped shrub with crowded, linear leaves and many tube-shaped, pale greenish-yellow flowers with blue tips.

Description
Flowering occurs from mid-September to late December.

Taxonomy
Lechenaultia acutiloba was first formally described in 1868 by George Bentham in Flora Australiensis from specimens collected near the Young River by George Maxwell. The specific epithet (acutiloba) means "sharp-pointed lobes", referring to the petals.

Distribution and habitat
Wingless leschenaultia usually grows near river banks, sometimes in swamps and is found between Ongerup and Ravensthorpe in the Esperance Plains and Mallee biogeographic regions of south-western Western Australia.

Conservation status
Lechenaultia acutiloba is listed as "Priority Three" by the Government of Western Australia Department of Biodiversity, Conservation and Attractions, meaning that it is poorly known and known from only a few locations but is not under imminent threat.

References

acutiloba
Garden plants of Australia
Plants described in 1868
Taxa named by George Bentham
Flora of Western Australia